BRE, Bre, or BrE may refer to:

Computing 
 Barren Realms Elite, a multi-player bulletin board system strategy game
 Basic regular expression, expressions used for computerized text matching
 Business rules engine, a software system to manage and execute business rules

Science 
 B recognition element, a DNA sequence 
 benign Rolandic epilepsy, a syndrome
 BRE (gene), human gene
 Bloom–Richardson–Elston grading system for breast cancer

Organisations 
 Building Research Establishment, institution in United Kingdom

Language 
 BrE, common abbreviation for British English
 bre (interjection)
 Breton language (SIL language code)

Transport 
 Bremen Airport, Germany (IATA code)
 Brentwood railway station (National Rail station code BRE)

Other uses 
 Bachelor of Religious Education
 Berkeley Review of Education, an academic journal
 Brè, a village in Switzerland
 Brecknockshire, historic county in Wales, Chapman code
 Bre people, an ethnic group in Burma
 Bustle Rack Extension, a storage bin mounted on the rear of the M1 Abrams tank's bustle rack
 Brock Racing Enterprises → Pete Brock